The Bokhara horseshoe bat (Rhinolophus bocharicus) is a species of bat in the family Rhinolophidae. It is found in Afghanistan, Turkmenistan, Uzbekistan, and possibly in Iran and Pakistan.

References

Rhinolophidae
Mammals of Afghanistan
Mammals of Pakistan
Mammals described in 1917
Taxonomy articles created by Polbot
Bats of Asia